Geoffrey or Geoff Scott may refer to:

 Geoffrey Scott (architectural historian) (1884–1929), English architectural historian and poet
 Geoffrey Scott (politician) (born 1938), former Canadian Member of Parliament
 Geoffrey Scott (actor) (1942–2021), American actor
 Geoff Scott (footballer) (1956–2018), English professional footballer

See also
 Jeff Scott (born 1980), American college football coach
 Jeff Scott (baseball writer) (born 1953), writer for Major League Baseball Productions